Congo Crossing is a 1956 American adventure film directed by Joseph Pevney and starring Virginia Mayo and George Nader. Most of the exterior sequences were shot in the  Los Angeles County Arboretum and Botanic Garden.

Plot
Congotanga, West Africa, has no extradition laws; the government is controlled by foreign gangsters, headed by Carl Rittner (Tonio Selwart). The latest plane from Europe carries Louise Whitman (Virginia Mayo), (fleeing a French murder charge), and Mannering (Raymond Bailey), who pays resident hit man O'Connell (Michael Pate) to kill her. Through a chain of circumstances Louise, O'Connell, and heroic surveyor David Carr (George Nader) end up alone in the jungle on Carr's mission to determine the true border of Congotanga... in which Rittner is keenly interested.

Cast
 Virginia Mayo as Louise Whitman
 George Nader as David Carr
 Peter Lorre as Colonel John Miguel Orlando Arragas
 Michael Pate as Bart O'Connell
 Rex Ingram as Dr. Leopold Gorman
 Tonio Selwart as Carl Rittner
 Kathryn Givney as Amelia Abbott
 Tudor Owen as Emile Zorfus
 Raymond Bailey as Peter Mannering
 George Ramsey as Miguel Diniz
 Maurice Donner as Marquette
 Bernie Hamilton as Pompala
 Harold Dyenforth as Steiner

See also
 List of American films of 1956

External links
 
 
 

1956 films
Universal Pictures films
1956 adventure films
Films directed by Joseph Pevney
Films set in Africa
Films set in Belgian Congo
American adventure films
1950s English-language films
1950s American films